The Department of Finance of West Bengal is a Bengal government department. The Department of Finance manages the State Government finances and is involved in all economic and financial subjects surrounding the State. This includes allocating and deploying financial resources for social welfare, infrastructure and administrative purposes.

References

Government departments of West Bengal
West Bengal